The College of Veterinarians of Ontario is the body charged by the Government of Ontario with regulating practising veterinarians in the province. The authority comes from the Veterinarians Act, RSO 1990, c V.3. It is also Ontario's only regulatory college to not be headquartered in Toronto: its head office is in Guelph, Ontario the location of the Ontario Veterinary College which is the province's only post-secondary institution providing training in veterinary medicine.

References

External links

Medical and health organizations based in Ontario
Ontario
Veterinary medicine-related professional associations
Veterinary medicine in Canada